Castiglione a Casauria is a comune and town in the province of Pescara in the Abruzzo region of Italy. It is located in the natural park known as the "Gran Sasso e Monti della Laga National Park".

Main sights
The Abbey of San Clemente a Casauria, one of the most important landmarks of Abruzzo
Palazzo de Petris-Fraggianni

Twin towns
 Hamilton, Canada

References